The Belarusian Red Cross Society is a Belarusian humanitarian organization and a member of the International Red Cross and Red Crescent Movement. Its purpose is to prevent and alleviate human suffering wherever and whenever it occurs, voluntarily and without discrimination.

Though first operating in the territory of what is now Belarus in 1872 as the Minsk local branch of the Russian Red Cross, the organization was officially founded in 1967. Within Belarus, it currently operates 166 regional and local branches.

References

External links
 IFRC - Where We Work - Belarus Red Cross Profile

Red Cross and Red Crescent national societies
1967 establishments in Belarus
Organizations established in 1967
Medical and health organizations based in Belarus